A law enforcement officer (LEO),  or peace officer in North American English, is a public-sector employee whose duties primarily involve the enforcement of laws. The phrase can include campaign disclosure specialists, local police officers, prosecutors (who are law enforcement officers but not peace officers), municipal law enforcement officers, health inspectors, SWAT officers, customs officers, lawyers, state troopers, federal agents, secret agents, special investigators, coast guards, border patrol officers, judges, district attorney, bounty hunters, gendarmerie officers, immigration officers, private investigators, court officers, probation officers, parole officers, arson investigators, auxiliary officers, animal control officers, game wardens, park rangers, county sheriff's deputies, constables, marshals, detention officers, correction officers, sworn campus police officers and public safety officers (at public and private institutions). Security guards are not law enforcement officers, unless they have been granted powers to enforce particular laws, such as those accredited under a community safety accreditation scheme such as a security police officer. 

Modern legal codes use the term peace officer (or in some jurisdictions, law enforcement officer) to include every person vested by the legislating state with law enforcement authority—traditionally, anyone "sworn, badged, and armable" who can arrest, or refer such arrest for a criminal prosecution. Hence, city police officers, county sheriffs' deputies, state troopers and in some states corrections officers are usually vested with the same authority within a given jurisdiction. Contract security officers may enforce certain laws and administrative regulations, which may include detainment or apprehension authority, including arresting. Peace officers may also be able to perform all duties that a law enforcement officer is tasked with, but may or may not be armed with a weapon.

Canada
In Canada, the Criminal Code (R.S., c. C-34, s. 2.) defines a peace officer as:

Section (b) allows for designation as a peace officer for a member of the Correctional Service of Canada under the following via the Corrections and Conditional Release Act:

Also, provincial legislatures can designate a class of officers (i.e. Conservation Officers, Park Rangers and Commercial Vehicle Safety and Enforcement) to be peace officers.

Sri Lanka
Under the Code Of Criminal Procedure a peace officer includes all police officers, a Divisional Assistant Government Agent and a Grama Niladharis appointed by a Government Agent (GA) in writing to perform police duties or keep the peace. A peace officer has the power to arrest a person without a warrant or an order from a magistrate under certain circumstances such as;

 who in his presence commits any breach of the peace,
 who has been concerned in any cognizable offense or against whom a reasonable complaint has been made or credible information has been received or a reasonable suspicion exists of his having been so concerned,
 having in his possession without lawful excuse any implement of house-breaking,
 who has been proclaimed as an offender,
 in whose possession anything is found which may reasonably be suspected to be property stolen or fraudulently obtained and who may reasonably be suspected of having committed an offense concerning such thing
 who obstructs a peace officer while in the execution of his duty or who has escaped or attempts to escape from lawful custody,
 suspected of being a military deserter,
 suspected of concealing his presence under circumstances which afford reason to believe that he is taking such precautions intending to commit a cognizable offense,
 who has been concerned in or against whom a reasonable complaint has been made or credible information has been received or a reasonable suspicion exists of his having been concerned in any act committed at any place out of Sri Lanka

During the British colonial administration of Ceylon, when uniformed policing by the Ceylon Police Force in rural areas of the island was limited, the local government agent would appoint individuals from wealthy influential families deemed loyal to the crown as a Peace Officers with police powers to keep the peace. This was an influential post, the holder had much control over the people of the area. Commonly a Native Headman (Ralahami) was appointed as the Peace Officer to maintain law and order in rural villages. 

Following the formation of the State Council of Ceylon in 1931, one of its members, H. W. Amarasuriya, called for an inquiry into the headman system. A commission was formed made up of retired civil servants and lawyers headed by H.M. Wedderburn. The commission reported on reforming the headman system or replacing it with transferable District Revenue Officers. The headman system was abolished as an administrative system, with the titles of Mudaliyar (Mudali - මුදලි) and Muhandiram retained by the government to be awarded as honors. This practice remained until the suspension of Ceylonese honors in 1956 by S. W. R. D. Bandaranaike. The minor headman positions were retained, surviving well into the 1970s when the post of Vidane was replaced with the transferable post of Grama Niladhari (Village Officer).

United States

United States federal law enforcement officers include the following:

 Bureau of Alcohol, Tobacco, Firearms and Explosives (ATF) special agents
 Bureau of Diplomatic Security special agents
 Customs and Border Protection (CBP) officers and United States Border Patrol agents
 Drug Enforcement Administration (DEA) special agents
 Federal air marshals
 Federal Bureau of Investigation (FBI) special agents
 Federal Flight Deck Officers
 Dept of Treasury Federal Reserve Police officers
U.S. Dept of Treasury Secret Service special agents and uniformed officers
 Dept. of Interior Fish and Wildlife Service Rangers
Dept. of Interior Bureau of Land Management Law Enforcement officers
 Dept. of Homeland Security Investigations (HSI) special agents
 DHS Immigration and Customs Enforcement (ICE) deportation officers
 Dept. of Interior National Park Service (park rangers and forest rangers)
 Dept. of Justice Federal Bureau of Prisons corrections officers
 Dept. of Homeland Service Transportation Security Administration US Marshals and Deputy Marshals
 U.S. Coast Guard officers, warrant officers, and petty officers
 United States Postal Service postal inspectors
 Federal Bureau of Prisons officers
 United States Department of Veterans Affairs Police
 United States military police, including the Army Military Police Corps, Air Force Security Forces, Navy master-at-arms, Marine Corps Police, provost marshal officers, and United States Department of Defense police

Arizona
Arizona Revised Statutes defines a peace officer in Title 13, Section 105, as "any person vested by law with a duty to maintain public order and make arrests and includes a constable." Title 1, Section 215(27) enumerates those who are peace officers in the State of Arizona. It includes:

 sheriffs of counties
 constables
 marshals
 SWAT officers and policemen of cities and towns
 commissioned personnel of the department of public safety and state troopers 
 personnel who are employed by the state department of corrections and the department of juvenile corrections and who have received a certificate from the Arizona peace officer standards and training board
 peace officers who are appointed by a multi-county water conservation district and who have received a certificate from the Arizona peace officer standards and training board
 police officers who are appointed by community college district governing boards and who have received a certificate from the Arizona peace officer standards and training board
 police officers who are appointed by the Arizona board of regents and who have received a certificate from the Arizona peace officer standards and training board
 police officers who are appointed by the governing body of a public airport according to section 28-8426 and who have received a certificate from the Arizona peace officer standards and training board
 peace officers who are appointed by a private post-secondary institution under section 15-1897 and who have received a certificate from the Arizona peace officer standards and training board 
 special agents from the office of the attorney general, or of a county attorney, and who have received a certificate from the Arizona peace officer standards and training board

Arizona Revised Statutes 41-1823 states that except for duly elected or appointed sheriffs and constables, and probation officers in the course of their duties, no person may exercise the authority or perform the duties of a peace officer unless he is certified by the Arizona peace officers standards and training board.

California

Sections 830 through 831.7 of the California Penal Code
list persons who are considered peace officers within the State of California.  Peace officers include, in addition to many others,

 Police; sheriffs, undersheriffs, and their deputies. (§ 830.1[a])
 Investigators of the California Department of Consumer Affairs. (§ 830.3[a])
 Inspectors or investigators employed in the office of a district attorney. (§ 830.1[a]) 
 The California Attorney General and special agents and investigators of the California Department of Justice. (§ 830.1[b])
 Members of the California Highway Patrol. (§ 830.2[a])
 Special agents of the California Department of Corrections and Rehabilitation. (§ 830.2[d])
 Game wardens of the California Department of Fish and Wildlife (§ 830.2[e])
 California State Park Peace Officers (§ 830.2[f])
 Investigators of the California Department of Alcoholic Beverage Control. (§ 830.2[h])
 Cal Expo Police Officers (§ 830.2[i])(§ 830.3[q])
 Investigators of the California Department of Motor Vehicles. (§ 830.3[c])
 The State Fire Marshal and assistant or deputy state fire marshals. (§ 830.3[e])
 Fraud investigators of the California Department of Insurance. (§ 830.3[i])
 Investigators of the Employment Development Department. (§ 830.3[q])
 A person designated by a local agency as a Park Ranger (§ 830.31[b])
 Members of the University of California Police Department, California State University Police Department or of a California Community College Police Department. (§ 830.2 [b]&[c]/ 830.32 [a])
 Members of the San Francisco Bay Area Rapid Transit District Police Department. (§ 830.33 [a])
 Any railroad police officer commissioned by the Governor. (§ 830.33 [e] [1])
 Welfare fraud Investigators of the California Department of Social Services. (§ 830.35[a])
 County coroners and deputy coroners. (§ 830.35[c])
 Firefighter/Security Officers of the California Military Department. (§ PC 830.37)
 Hospital Police Officers with the California Department of State Hospitals (used to be California Department of Mental Health) and the California Department of Developmental Services (§ 830.38)
 County Probation Officers, County Deputy Probation Officers, Parole officers and correctional officers of the California Department of Corrections and Rehabilitation. (§ 830.5 [a]&[b])
 A security officer for a private university or college deputized or appointed as a reserve deputy sheriff or police officer. (§ 830.75)

Most peace officers have jurisdiction throughout the state, but many have limited powers outside their political subdivisions. Some peace officers require special permission to carry firearms. Powers are often limited to the performance of peace officers' primary duties (usually, enforcement of specific laws within their political subdivision); however, most have power of arrest anywhere in the state for any public offense
that poses an immediate danger to a person or property.

A private person (i.e., ordinary citizen) may arrest another person for an offense committed in the arresting person's presence, or if the other person has committed a felony whether or not in the arresting person's presence (Penal Code § 837), though such an arrest when an offense has not occurred leaves a private person open to criminal prosecution and civil liability for false arrest. A peace officer may:
 without an arrest warrant, arrest a person on probable cause that the person has committed an offense in the officer's presence, or if there is probable cause that a felony has been committed and the officer has probable cause to believe the person to be arrested committed the felony. (Penal Code § 836). 
 Is immune from civil liability for false arrest if, at the time of arrest, the officer had probable cause to believe the arrest was lawful.

Persons are required to comply with certain instructions given by a peace officer, and certain acts (e.g., battery) committed against a peace officer carry more severe penalties than the same acts against a private person. It is unlawful to resist, delay, or obstruct a peace officer in the course of the officer's duties (Penal Code § 148[a][1]).

New York State

New York State grants peace officers very specific powers under NYS Criminal Procedure Law, that they may make warrantless arrests, use physical and deadly force, and issue summonses under section 2.20 of that law.

There is a full list of peace officers under Section 2.10 of that law.  Below are some examples.

 That state has law enforcement agencies contained within existing executive branch departments that employ sworn peace officers to investigate and enforce laws specifically related to the department.  Most often, these departments employ sworn Investigators (separate from the New York State Police) that have statewide investigative authority under the department's mission.
 The New York State Bureau of Narcotic Enforcement (BNE) is a state investigative agency housed under the State Department of Health.  Narcotic Investigators with the Bureau of Narcotic Enforcement are sworn peace officers who carry firearms, make arrests, and enforce the New York State Controlled Substances Act, New York State Penal Law, and New York State Public Health Law.
 The New York State Department of Taxation and Finance employs sworn peace officers as Excise Tax Investigators and Revenue Crimes Investigators.  These State Investigators carry firearms, make arrests, and enforce New York State Penal Law related to tax evasion and other crimes.  Excise Tax Investigators may execute Search Warrants.
 The New York State Department of Motor Vehicles (DMV) Division of Field Investigation also employ sworn peace officers as State Investigators.  All DMV Investigators carry Glock 23 firearms and enforce New York State Penal Law and New York Vehicle and Traffic Law. The DMV Division of Field Investigation investigates auto theft, odometer tampering, fraudulent documents, and identity theft crimes.

Texas
Texas Statutes, Code of Criminal Procedure, Art. 2.12, provides:

See also
National Law Enforcement Officers Memorial
Peace Officers Memorial Day

References
Notes

 Law enforcement in the United States
 Law enforcement in Canada
 Legal professions

 Law enforcement occupations